Heitsi-eibib, also known as Haiseb or Haitse-aibeb, is a mythic hero figure in the mythology of the Khoikhoi or Khoekhoe people, who originated in southwestern Africa. He is sometimes depicted as a trickster, and with Gaunab and Tsui’goab, is a central figure in Khoekhoe folklore.

Representation 
In his depictions, Heitsi-eibib sometimes appears as either a full-grown adult or a child. In one folklore, the child Heitsi-eibib became an adult and had sexual intercourse with his mother, then suddenly turned into a baby at the end. Even as an adult, he is a well-known shapeshifter, as his figure changes from one story to another. 

Although Heitsi-eibib is a mythological figure, he had many real-life tombs in the form of cairns located in South Africa and Namibia.

Legends

Defeating Ga-Gorib 
Ga-Gorib is a monster associated with Gaunab, the god of the underworld in Khoekhoe mythology. Ga-Gorib often challenges people to throw a stone at his forehead while he sat at the edge of a big and deep hole on the ground. However, if anyone takes up his challenge, only certain death awaits since the stone would bounce back and kill the person who threw it. 

It is said that Heitsi-eibib discovered these deaths and decided to defeat Ga-Gorib by slaying him. So, Heitsi-eibib went to the Ga-Gorib’s location, where the latter immediately challenged Heitsi-eibib to throw a stone at his forehead. Heitsi-eibib refused to rise to the provocation and distracted Ga-Gorib enough to hit him behind his ear. Ga-Gorib was surprised and lost his balance and fell into the deep hole.

In another version, Ga-Gorib chased after Heitsi-eibib when he refused the challenge, and they had a fight after both of them fell into the pit. Just like the first version, Ga-Gorib died, while Heitsi-eibib lived on.

See also 

 List of African mythological figures

References 

African mythology